Mike Newton (born 14 April 1960 in Manchester) is a British businessman and racing driver. He is the founder and CEO of the AD Group of companies, which includes its solution arm AD Network Video. He raced in the Le Mans Series and 24 Hours of Le Mans in cars prepared by the RML Group. Newton was named Britain's Top Entrepreneur by Management Today magazine in 2005.

Racing career
Newton began in motorsport as a marshal in 1977. In 1985, he took part in his first circuit race in Formula Ford. He was a regular competitor in Champion of Oulton Park Formula Ford series from 1985 through 1997, and had top three championship finishes between 1995 and 1997. In 1999, he finished sixth in the Bathurst 500. In 2001 he finished first in class at the 6hr Langstreckenpokal (VLN) at the Nurburgring on the Nordschliefe in an ex-Dick Johnson ATCC Falcon EL, and repeated that feat at the 2002 Grand Am Finale GTS Class in a Saleen S7R at Daytona.

In 2002 Newton made his GT debut at both the Daytona 24 Hours and British GT in a Porsche 996 GTR with Graham Nash Motorsport.

In 2003 he made his debut in the 24 Hours of Le Mans, racing a Saleen S7-R for Graham Nash Motorsport alongside Thomas Erdos and Pedro Chaves, the car being sponsored by some of Newton's companies. The team finished sixth in the GTS class. Newton and Erdos also raced the car in the FIA GT Championship.

For 2004 Newton and Erdos continued to race the Saleen in FIA GT for RML. They also raced in the Le Mans Series for the team in an MG-Lola EX257. They also raced the car at Le Mans, but retired from the race. In 2005 the team moved from the LMP1 category to the LMP2 category, winning the class at Le Mans and finishing second in the Le Mans Series. They repeated this feat in 2006. In 2007, Newton and Erdos won the Le Mans Series LMP2 category.

In 2010, Newton, Erdos and Wallace finished third in the LMP2 Class at Le Mans in a Lola HPD Coupe, and Newton and Erdos won the Le Mans Series LMP2 Drivers Title, with RML winning the LMP2 Team title, accompanied at different races by both Andy Wallace and Ben Collins.

In 2008 Newton was elected vice-president of the British Motorsport Marshals Club. Newton has been a BRDC member since 2008.

For 2012 Newton stepped back from the troubled ELMS series due to a lack of funding from ailing business interests, and undertook the development of a Speed Euroseries CN car, bringing the Tiga Race Cars name back to Sportscar racing with the Tiga CN012, leading the development activities, and also as a driver, partnered by Dean Stirling. Newton also made a one-off appearance in the Silverstone Classic in the Fujifilm Touring Cars race in a 1995 RML Group Super Touring Cavalier.

After a short break from racing, Newton returned in the MG-Lola EX257-AER #25 for the Masters Endurance Legends series, taking two class poles and two class wins in the Imola round in April 2018.

Newton completed four rounds in the 2018 Master Endurance Legends, Imola, Silverstone, Nurburgring and Spa achieving 8 Class pole positions, 8 fastest laps, and 8 wins for LMP2 cars from 2000 to 2005. At the final round he competed in at Spa, in race 1 finished 1st LMP2 overall against cars of any era up to 2012, running as high as 4th overall in the second race. Newton still competes in the Masters Endurance Legends regularly with the EX257, having taken 4 class wins out of 6 races after the Silverstone Classic. He is also set to compete in a support race for the 2021 24 Hours of Le Mans in the same car, the EX257.

Career Results

Complete 24 Hours of Le Mans results

Complete Bathurst 24 Hour results

References

External links

AD Group
RML AD Group
AD Team Tiga

Living people
1960 births
Businesspeople from Manchester
British businesspeople
British racing drivers
Formula Ford drivers
24 Hours of Daytona drivers
FIA GT Championship drivers
24 Hours of Le Mans drivers
European Le Mans Series drivers
Sportspeople from Manchester
24 Hours of Spa drivers
Cheever Racing drivers